Badreddin al-Houthi (3 November 1926 – 25 November 2010) also spelled Badr al-Din Al-Houthi was a Yemeni politician and scholar of Zaidi Shia Islam.

Life
He was born in Dahyan, Saada. He is one of the founders of the Party of Truth in Yemen and the spiritual leader of Ansar Allah movement. He is the father of Abdul-Malik and Hussein. Upon the death of Hussein in 2004, he briefly took over the leadership of the Houthi movement.

In 2010 he died at the age of 84 as a result of complications relating to asthma.

References

Yemeni politicians
Zaidiyyah scholars
Houthi members
1926 births
2010 deaths
Deaths from asthma
People from Saada Governorate
Houthi family